The Sustenhorn is a  mountain in the Uri Alps, located on the border between the cantons of Bern and Uri. It overlook Susten Pass from the south.

Both sides of the massif are glaciated. On the west side (Bern) lies the Stein Glacier and on the east side (Uri) lies the smaller Flachensteinfirn. The larger massif consists of several other mountains, the principal being Vorder Sustenhorn (3,318 metres), Chli Sustenhorn (3,309 metres) on the north and Sustenlimihorn (3,316 metres) on the south.

It was climbed for the first time in 1841 by a team that took the route from Innertkirchen

References

External links

 
 Sustenhorn on Hikr

Mountains of the Alps
Alpine three-thousanders
Mountains of Switzerland
Mountains of the canton of Uri
Mountains of the canton of Bern
Bern–Uri border